Coulombe is a surname. Notable people with the surname include:

Benoit Coulombe (born 1958), Canadian scientist
Carmen Coulombe (1946–2008), Canadian artist
Charles Coulombe (disambiguation), multiple people
Clotilde Coulombe (1892–1985), Canadian classical pianist and Roman Catholic nun
Danny Coulombe (born 1989), American baseball player
Guy Coulombe (1936–2011), Canadian civil servant
Joe Coulombe (1930–2020), American businessman and founder of Trader Joe's
Martine Coulombe, Canadian politician
Patrick Coulombe (born 1985), Canadian ice hockey player

See also
François Coulombe-Fortier (born 1984), Canadian taekwondo practitioner
Coulomb (disambiguation), includes a list of people with surname Coulomb